C/1963 A1 (Ikeya), also known as Comet 1963I and 1963a, is a long period comet discovered by Kaoru Ikeya on 2 January 1963. The comet last passed perihelion on 21 March 1963, when it reached an apparent magnitude of 2.8.

Observational history 
The comet was discovered by the Japanese amateur astronomer Kaoru Ikeya on 2 January 1963. At that time Kauro Ikeya was 19 years old and used a self-made 8-inch telescope. The comet was then located three degrees southwest of π Hydrae, had an estimated magnitude of 12 and was diffuse. He confirmed his finding the next day and telegraphed his discovery to the Tokyo Astronomical Observatory, and the new comet was photographed with the Brashear Astrograph.

The comet at discovery was moving rapidly southwards and after 25 January couldn't be observed from the north hemisphere. The comet became circumpolar in the southern sky and between February 11 and February 13 was in the constellation of Octans, near the south celestrial pole, and then moved northwards. The comet grew a tail that photographically was estimated to be 8 degrees long on February 18, while it reached third magnitude and was visible with naked eye. The tail had originally a simple straight form but its structure became more complex by the end of the month.

By March 1963 the comet again became visible in the northern hemisphere. By March 10 the apparent magnitude of the comet was estimated to be 4.5. The length of the tail was reported to be as long as nearly 20 degrees on 21 March, the date of the perihelion. After perihelion the comet was in conjunction with the Sun and couldn't be observed. It reached its minimum elongation of 4° on 12 April.

The comet was recovered in mid May in the morning sky and was brighter than expected, as the comet faded in a slower rate than it brightened, having a magnitude of 7 to 8. The brighter than expected comet led to some reports that this was a new comet, but photographic observations revealed that there was only one comet in the region, comet Ikeya. In long exposure photographs in mid June the tail was more than half a degree long. The comet faded rapidly in September and October and was last observed on 12 October.

Scientific resuts 

On March 5th and 6th, 1963, spectrograms of the comet could be taken at the Palomar Observatory in California, showing the emission lines of CN, C2 and C3. The ratio of the isotopes 12C/13C could be determined from the intensities. The value was in a range comparable to that on Earth. The spectrum obtained from Lick Observatory showed the presence of diatomic carbon and NH2 and also featured a strong line in λ 6200.

Meteor showers 
The comet is considered to be the parent body of a number of meteor showers, as it has been modeled to create five streams that intersect with the orbit of Earth. Two of these meteor showers have been identified as π-Hydrids and δ-Corvids. Also the meteor shower of α-Sextantids could also be associated with comet Ikeya. One more meteor shower visible in the data of the Cameras for Allsky Meteor Surveillance, named ϑ-Leonids is also a good match with the predicted meteor streams.

References 

Long-period comets
1963 in science
19630102
Discoveries by amateur astronomers